Hank Henry (July 9, 1906 – March 31, 1981) was an American comedian, known for his stage work on the Las Vegas Strip for decades. He was also a film and television actor.  Henry got his start in American burlesque and was the comic to straightman Robert Alda, Alan Alda's father.

Biography

Henry was born Henry Rosenthal in New York City; the son of Anna (née Richards), and Franklin Rosenthal. Henry's mother came from England, and his father was German-American descended from the Pennsylvania Dutch.

Hank Henry made his screen debut in 1937, in a comedy short, Dime a Dance, produced in New York by Educational Pictures. The film also featured up-and-coming performers Imogene Coca, Danny Kaye, June Allyson, and Barry Sullivan. It was a one-shot assignment, which Henry filmed during a burlesque engagement. Henry relocated to California and resumed his movie career in 1943. He acted in films such as This Is the Army, Junior Prom, The Joker Is Wild, Pal Joey, Ocean's 11, Pepe, the burlesque comedy Not Tonight Henry (in which Henry played all the leading male roles), Sergeants 3, Johnny Cool, Robin and the 7 Hoods, and The Only Game in Town. Henry made his television debut in The Thin Man in the episode "The Case of the Baggy Pants" portrayed Noonan. Henry last appeared on television 1970.

Henry died on March 31, 1981, in Las Vegas, Nevada, at the age of 74. He had suffered from cancer.

Filmography

References

External links 
 
 Hank Henry at Allmovie

1906 births
1981 deaths
American male film actors
American male television actors
Male actors from New York City
Deaths from cancer in Nevada
20th-century American male actors